Toyota Center is an indoor arena in Houston, Texas that is home to the Houston Rockets:

Toyota Center may also refer to:
Toyota Center (Kennewick) in Kennewick, Washington
Tim's Toyota Center in Prescott Valley, Arizona
Town Toyota Center in Wenatchee, Washington is home to the Wenatchee Wild
Toyota Sports Center in El Segundo, California

See also
 Toyota (disambiguation)
 Toyota Stadium (disambiguation)
 Toyota Park (disambiguation)
 Toyota Arena (disambiguation)